Subramaniam Nadarajah was a Sri Lankan Tamil lawyer, politician and member of the Senate of Ceylon.

Known as "Pottar" Nadarajah, he was one of the pioneers of All Ceylon Tamil Congress. He was one of the organisers of the 1961 satyagraha led by the Illankai Tamil Arasu Kachchi (Federal Party). He was a member of the Senate of Ceylon from 1965 to 1971.

In 1981 Nadarajah became the first and only chairman of the Jaffna District Development Council. He resigned in 1983, stating that he didn't even have the power to "purchase table and chairs" for the council.

Nadarajah was shot dead on 12 February 1988, aged 72. It's alleged that he was assassinated by the rebel Liberation Tigers of Tamil Eelam for associating with the Indian Peace Keeping Force.

References

1988 deaths
All Ceylon Tamil Congress politicians
Members of the Senate of Ceylon
Assassinated Sri Lankan politicians
People from Northern Province, Sri Lanka
People killed during the Sri Lankan Civil War
People from British Ceylon
Sri Lankan Tamil lawyers
Sri Lankan Tamil politicians
Tamil United Liberation Front politicians
Year of birth missing
Indian Peace Keeping Force